Justin Neumann (born 17 March 1998) is a German footballer who plays as a midfielder for SG 1919 Trebitz.

References

External links
 

1998 births
Living people
People from Wittenberg
German footballers
Association football midfielders
Hallescher FC players
3. Liga players
Footballers from Saxony-Anhalt